The Gangneung Olympic Village is a complex of high-rise apartments in Gangneung, South Korea. As an Olympic Village it hosted the attendees, which included competitors and their coaches, during the event.

References

Venues of the 2018 Winter Olympics
Olympic Villages
Sports venues in Gangneung
Buildings and structures in Gangneung